Uwe Pape (born 5 May 1936) is a German business information scientist and organ expert.

Early life and education
Pape was born in Bremen. After graduating from gymnasium there, Pape studied mathematics, physics, pedagogy and philosophy at the Georg-August-Universität in Göttingen from 1955 to 1959, graduating with a diploma and a state examination. In 1965, he received his scientific doctorate in computing technology, with advisor Horst Herrmann at the TU Braunschweig, where he was a research assistant from 1959 to 1971.

Career
From 1971 to 2001, Pape was professor in business informatics at the Faculty of Electrical Engineering and Computer Science at Technische Universität Berlin. He was visiting professor at the Massachusetts Institute of Technology in Cambridge in Massachusetts in 1974 and 1984/1985, at the University of Maryland, College Park in 1975, at the University of Texas at Austin in 1976, and at the University of Szczecin from 1988 to 1998. In Dresden, he developed a new faculty for traffic at the Dresden University of Technology, responsible for the economics course.

His research focused on optimisation methods in graphs and networks and optimisation methods in logistics, especially maritime transport logistics. A long-standing cooperation with the BLG Logistics and the Hamburger Hafen und Logistik.

Organ expert 
Pape had his first contact with organ building in 1953 at the Bremen Liebfrauenkirche where he was a student of Harald Wolff. During his studies he had contact with the organ builder . Pape began to inventory the organs of the Braunschweig Lutheran Church in 1959. In 1962, he founded a publishing house for organ building history. Pape works as a freelance organ expert for regional churches and foundations in Berlin, Bremen, Lower Saxony and Saxony. From 1985 to 2016, he led a research project on organ documentation which resulted in an organ database at the TU Berlin. Together with Paul Peeters from Gothenburg and Karl Schütz from Vienna, Pape was one of the founders of the International Association for Organ Documentation (IAOD) in 1990. He has made a significant contribution to the documentary indexing of the northern German organ landscape. Since 2000 he has been a member of the Vente Foundation (Stichting Utrecht Orgelarchief ).

Publications

Business 
 with Detlef Karras, Lutz Kredel: Entwicklungsumgebungen für Expertensysteme. Vergleichende Darstellung ausgewählter Systeme. de Gruyter, Berlin among others 1987, .
 with T. Frauenstein, O. Wagner: Objektorientierte Sprachkonzepte und diskrete Simulation : Klassifikation, Vergleich und Bewertung von Konzepten der Programmiersprachen Simula 67, Modula 2, Pascal, Smalltalk 80 und Beta aus objektorientierter Sicht vor dem Hintergrund des Anwendungsgebietes der diskreten Simulation. Springer, Berlin among others 1990, .

History of organ building 
Monographs and essays
 with Karl Heinz Bielefeld: Friedrich Werder – August von Werder. Orgelbauer in Elliehausen und Höckelheim. (Norddeutsche Orgelbauer und ihre Werke. Vol. 10). Pape, Berlin 2017, .
 Organographia Historica Hildesiensis. Orgeln und Orgelbauer in Hildesheim. Pape, Berlin 2014, .
 with Georg Schloetmann: 175 Jahre Emil Hammer Orgelbau. Pape, Berlin 2013, .
 
 
 
 
 
 
 
 
 
 
 
 
 
 
 
  
 
 
 Articles: Buchholz, Carl August; Führer, Alfred; Furtwängler, Familie; Giesecke, Familie; Gloger, Familie; Grüneberg, Familie; Lütkemüller, Friedrich Hermann; Reubke, Familie; Röver, Familie; Scherer, Familie; Schuke, Familie. In Die Musik in Geschichte und Gegenwart. Kassel, Bärenreiter 1999–2007.

Editor

References

External links 
 
 
 IAOD – Publikationen / Monographien zur Orgeldokumentation (in German) International Association for Organ Documentation (IAOD) 2020
 Veröffentlichungen der GdO (list of publications, in German) Gesellschaft der Orgelfreunde 2021

Academic staff of the Technical University of Berlin
German book publishers (people)
1936 births
Living people
Writers from Bremen